The Pingxiang steel plant explosion occurred on August 21, 2000, when an oxygen generator in a steel plant located in Pingxiang, Jiangxi, China, exploded. At least 19 steel workers were killed as a result of the incident.

See also 

 Qinghe Special Steel Corporation disaster
List of industrial disasters

References 

Industrial fires and explosions in China
2000 disasters in China
2000 fires in Asia
Explosions in 2000
2000 industrial disasters